Over the Fence is a Finnish short film written by Ilmari Aho and Hamy Ramezan and directed by Hamy Ramezan. The screenplay for the film took part in a scriptwriting competition organized by The Finnish Film Foundation and The Finnish Broadcasting Company YLE in early 2008.
Out of 53 submitted screenplays, Over the Fence was selected to be produced. The film was shot in April 2009 with €170,000 budget.

Festivals 
Over the Fence won Mention Ada Solomon at 2010 Clermont-Ferrand Short Film Festival and prize for Best International Short Film at 2010 Santiago de Compostela Curtocircuito Short Film Festival. The film was also awarded at 2010 CFC Toronto International Short Film Festival as a Best Live Action Short Film, which made it eligible for Academy Awards.

References

External links 
 Over the Fence at the production company's website 

2009 short films
2009 films
2000s Finnish-language films
Finnish short films